The 1996 Northwestern Wildcats football team represented Northwestern University in the 1996 NCAA Division I-A college football season. Under head coach Gary Barnett, Northwestern finished the season with a 9–3 record.  The Wildcats won a share of the Big Ten Conference title for the second straight year.  They faced off against Tennessee in the Florida Citrus Bowl, where the Wildcats lost, 48–28.

Schedule

Roster

Rankings

Game summaries

Wake Forest

Duke

Ohio

Indiana

Michigan

Minnesota

Wisconsin

Illinois

Penn State

Iowa

Purdue

Florida Citrus Bowl

Awards and honors
Linebacker Pat Fitzgerald: Chuck Bednarik Award, Bronko Nagurski Trophy, Big Ten Defensive Player of the Year
Head coach Gary Barnett: Big Ten Coach of the Year

Team players drafted into the NFL

References

Northwestern
Northwestern Wildcats football seasons
Big Ten Conference football champion seasons
Northwestern Wildcats football